John Grey (died 1413) of Exeter, Devon, was an English politician.

He was a Member (MP) of the Parliament of England for Exeter in 1366, October 1377, January 1380, 1385, 1386, 1391, 1393, 1394, 1395 and January 1397; for Barnstaple in 1385 and Totnes in 1391.

References

14th-century births
1413 deaths
English MPs 1366
Members of the Parliament of England (pre-1707) for Exeter
Members of the Parliament of England (pre-1707) for Totnes
Members of the Parliament of England (pre-1707) for Barnstaple
English MPs October 1377
English MPs January 1380
English MPs 1385
English MPs 1386
English MPs 1391
English MPs 1393
English MPs 1394
English MPs 1395
English MPs January 1397